Hrušov is a village and municipality in the Veľký Krtíš District of the Banská Bystrica Region of southern Slovakia. Hrušov is located in a historical region Hont.

History
In historical records, the village was first mentioned in 1285 (1285 Huruso, 1312 Hurson, 1342 Hruso). It belonged to Bzovík castle and in the 19th century to Hussáry and, after, to Esztergom's ecclesiastical Capitol.

Genealogical resources

The records for genealogical research are available at the state archive "Statny Archiv in Banska Bystrica, Slovakia"

 Roman Catholic church records (births/marriages/deaths): 1787-1894 (parish A)

See also
 List of municipalities and towns in Slovakia

References

External links
 
 
http://www.e-obce.sk/obec/hrusov/hrusov.html
Surnames of living people in Hrusov

Villages and municipalities in Veľký Krtíš District